George R. Clark  (March 20, 1857 – December 14, 1945) was a rear admiral in the United States Navy. George R. Clark served in various capacities as an instructor, navigator, line officer, station commandant, and retired as Judge Advocate General of the Navy in the late 19th and early 20th centuries.

Born in Norfolk, Virginia
Rear Admiral Clark was born in Monroe, Ohio, 20 March 1857, he was appointed to the Naval Academy from his native state in 1874, he graduated on 20 June 1878, promoted to Midshipman in June 1880, to Ensign (junior grade) in March 1883, and was commissioned Ensign, 24 August 1883.

Naval Service

He then had brief duty at William Cramp and Sons Shipyard, Philadelphia, Pennsylvania, and rejoined Michigan in April 1890.

He had compass instruction in the Bureau of Equipment and Recruiting, Washington, D. C., from February to March 1901, and in April 1901, became Officer in Charge of the Branch Hydrographic Office, Cleveland, Ohio, serving in that assignment until May 1920. For a year thereafter he served as Aide to the Commandant of the Norfolk Navy Yard, Portsmouth, Virginia.

He commanded the battleship  from September 1906 until August 1907, when he returned to the Naval Academy to serve as Head of the Department of English. During the latter period of his three years there, he was also Commander of the Naval Academy Practice Squadron on board , and for several months commanded that battleship.

In August 1914, he reported to the Secretary of the Navy, Josephus Daniels, for duty as Aide for Education. Detached from that assignment in June 1915, he next served for a year as Senior member, Naval Examining and Naval Retirement Board, with additional duty as a Member of the Marine Examining Board. In August 1916, he was designated Commandant, Naval Station, Hawaii, and in March 1917, was assigned additional duty as a member of the Joint Board in Connection with the Defense of the Island of Oahu, Territory of Hawaii.

In May 1918, during World War I, Rear Admiral Clark returned to the United States for duty as Judge Advocate General of the Navy. He was transferred to the Retired List of the Navy in February 1921, but continued active duty as Judge Advocate General until April 30, of that year, when he was released from all active duty. For outstanding services during and following World War I, he was awarded the Distinguished Service Medal.

Rear Admiral Clark, in collaboration with others, wrote a Short History of the United States Navy, which was published in 1911, and subsequently used as a text book at the Naval Academy. He also was the author of several articles published in the Naval Institute Proceedings.

He died in Washington, D. C., on December 14, 1945.

Awards
In addition to the Distinguished Service Medal, Rear Admiral Clark had the Spanish Campaign Medal; the Philippine Campaign Medal; and the Victory Medal with Base Clasp.

Notes 

Citations

Bibliography 

Online resources

Further reading

External links
 

1857 births
1945 deaths
United States Navy rear admirals (upper half)
United States Naval Academy alumni
United States Navy personnel of World War I
United States Navy Judge Advocate General's Corps
People from Monroe, Ohio